"Calm After the Storm" is a song by Dutch country rock duo The Common Linnets (Ilse DeLange and Waylon). It was chosen internally to represent the Netherlands at the Eurovision Song Contest 2014 in Denmark. In the contest it placed second with 238 points.

Music video
The music video, shot entirely black-and-white, was filmed in March 2014 in Edam.

Performances
The song was first performed live, in an acoustic version, on 12 March 2014 on TV program De Wereld Draait Door. The studio version was presented on 13 March 2014.

Eurovision
After having taken the first place in the first semi-final of the Eurovision Song Contest in Copenhagen on 6 May 2014, the song finished in second place in the final on 10 May 2014, behind the winning song "Rise Like a Phoenix" by Conchita Wurst from Austria. This was the highest position for the Netherlands since it last won in 1975, and the highest score for the Netherlands in all the Eurovision contests until Duncan Laurence’s victory with the song "Arcade" in the 2019 edition of the contest.

In addition to their high placement in the contest, the Netherlands picked up two Marcel Bezençon Awards: the Artistic Award, chosen by the commentators from the various participating broadcasters, and the Composers Award, chosen by the songwriters of all the participating songs from the 2014 contest.

Chart performance
On 18 May 2014, it reached number 9 in the UK singles chart, becoming 2014's highest charting Eurovision single, and the fourth non-winning Eurovision song from outside the UK to enter the top ten, the other songs being "Nel blu dipinto di blu" (Italy 1958), "Si" (Italy 1974) and "I See a Star" (Netherlands 1974).

Weekly charts

Year-end charts

Certifications

See also
 Netherlands in the Eurovision Song Contest 2014

References

2014 songs
The Common Linnets songs
Eurovision songs of the Netherlands
Eurovision songs of 2014
Articles containing video clips
Number-one singles in Iceland
Songs written by Rob Crosby
Ultratop 50 Singles (Flanders) number-one singles
Universal Music Group singles